Direct Hits may refer to:

 Direct Hits (The Who album), 1968
 Direct Hits (The Killers album), 2013